Dadegaon is a village in Ashti tahsil of Beed District in Marathwada region of Maharashtra state, India.

Geography 
Author : Garje Vasant

It is situated approximate 610 meters (2001.31 feet) above sea level. It is located 109 km towards west from District headquarters Beed.  54 km towards East from Ahmednagar. 10 km towards North from Kada. 46 km towards south from Pathardi. Dadegaon is 313 km from State capital Mumbai.

Dadegaon is surrounded by Jamkhed Taluka towards East, Patoda Taluka towards East, Karjat Taluka towards South, Shirur ( Ka ) Taluka towards North, Ahmednagar District towards West.

Demographics 
As of 2011 India census Dadegaon had a population of 2846 of which 1500 are males while 1346 are females. In Dadegaon village population of children with age 0-6 is 341 which makes up 11.98% of total population of village. Average Sex Ratio of Dadegaon village is 897 which is lower than Maharashtra state average of 929. Child Sex Ratio for the Dadegaon as per census is 795, lower than Maharashtra average of 894.

Dadegaon village has lower literacy rate compared to Maharashtra. In 2011, literacy rate of Dadegaon village was 69.90% compared to 82.34% of Maharashtra. In Dadegaon Male literacy stands at 78.85% while female literacy rate was 60.08%.

As per constitution of India and Panchyati Raaj Act, Dadegaon village is administrated by Sarpanch (Head of Village) who is elected representative of village.

Education

Schools 
 Zilla Parishad High School, Dadegaon
 Prabhu Ramchandra Vidyalaya, Dadegaon

Colleges near Dadegaon 

 Shri Ram Junior College, Kada
 Pt.javaharlal Nehru Jr. College, Ashti
 Bhagawan Mahavidyalay, Ashti
 Amolak Jain Vidhyalaya, Kada
 Anandrao Dhode College, Kada

Culture 

Marathi is the local language.

Main occupation of people is farming.
In Dadegaon village out of total population, 1639 were engaged in work activities. 96.95% of workers describe their work as Main Work (Employment or Earning more than 6 Months) while 3.05% were involved in Marginal activity providing livelihood for less than 6 months. Of 1639 workers engaged in Main Work, 1048 were cultivators (owner or co-owner) while 420 were Agricultural labourer.

Dadegaon has water supply under Kadi project which was on the higher level than town.
Dadegaon hosts the popular annual Ram Navami fair in March/April.

References

Villages in Beed district